The 1914 Vanderbilt Commodores football team represented Vanderbilt University in the 1914 Southern Intercollegiate Athletic Association football season. The 1914 season was Dan McGugin's 11th year as head coach. Members of the Southern Intercollegiate Athletic Association, the Commodores played six home games in Nashville, Tennessee and finished the season with a record of 2–6 and 1–3 in conference play. Michigan reporters spread rumors that Josh Cody was put out of the game for slugging, though he just suffered an injury. Despite the poor record, tackle Josh Cody, quarterback Irby Curry and fullback Ammie Sikes were selected for Outing's Roll of Honor.

Schedule

References

Vanderbilt
Vanderbilt Commodores football seasons
Vanderbilt Commodores football